WLAX (channel 25), licensed to La Crosse, Wisconsin, United States, and WEUX (channel 48), licensed to Chippewa Falls, Wisconsin, are television stations affiliated with the Fox network and serving the La Crosse–Eau Claire market. The stations are owned by Nexstar Media Group. WLAX maintains studios at Interchange Place in La Crosse and a transmitter in La Crescent, Minnesota, while WEUX has offices on WIS 93 in Eau Claire and a transmitter southeast of Colfax.

WLAX in La Crosse went on the air in November 1986, after two sales of the permit, as the original independent station in the market. Family Group Broadcasting, which put the station on the air, attempted to build the Eau Claire-area station but fell into bankruptcy before it could do so. Aries Telecommunications of Green Bay bought WLAX and the then-unbuilt WEUX in 1991, with WEUX beginning broadcasting in 1993. Grant Broadcasting acquired the pair in 1996, and Nexstar acquired Grant's stations in 2014. The stations air a 9 p.m. local newscast produced by local NBC affiliate WEAU.

History

Construction of WLAX
Channel 25 had been assigned to La Crosse since 1966 and almost saw use in the late 1960s when two groups proposed to start a second station in the city. Midcontinent Broadcasting Company was approved in December 1967 to build a satellite of its Madison station, WKOW-TV, in La Crosse. WKOW and La Crosse radio station WKTY had both applied for channel 19, causing WKOW to shift its application to channel 25 before WKTY withdrew after the WKOW-TV grant, citing its inability to obtain network affiliation given that the WKOW station would provide La Crosse with its first full-time ABC service. WKOW then sought to move its station, WXOW-TV, back to channel 19.

No party filed for channel 25 until 1980, when a group of local investors under the name Quarterview Inc. applied for channel 25. While some of the same investors built local radio station WISQ (100.1 FM), the permit was granted in 1982. Quarterview did not build the station. It sold the permit in 1984 to TV-26 Inc., owner of WLRE-TV in Green Bay. That station then filed for bankruptcy reorganization and was purchased, along with the channel 25 construction permit, by Family Group Broadcasting in 1985.

Family Group handled the construction process. The call sign on the permit was changed from WWQI to WLAX; land was purchased at the La Crosse market antenna farm in La Crescent, Minnesota (though it ultimately used an existing tower); and programming was purchased for the first independent station in the market. After delays, WLAX signed on on November 10, 1986.

Construction of WEUX
The addition of a channel 48 station at Chippewa Falls had been planned since the mid-1980s. Pat Bushland of Bushland Radio Specialties, owner of radio station WCFW, was first to apply for the station in 1984. Family Group Broadcasting then also filed for the channel in September 1986; helped by its favorable comparative hearing status as not already owning a station in Chippewa Falls, it prevailed in a settlement with Bushland in 1987 and announced plans to build it as an extension of WLAX. Family Group struggled to find an antenna site. In 1988, the company switched to a proposed location near Colfax only to face rejection from the Federal Aviation Administration (FAA). Meanwhile, the company's financial picture was dimming rapidly. In 1989, the company filed for Chapter 7 bankruptcy. Two attempts, one before and one after the bankruptcy, to sell the station group to Krypton Broadcasting fell through. In February 1990, Aries Telecommunications agreed to buy part of the company: WLAX, the WEUX construction permit, and WGBA-TV (the former WLRE-TV). However, the sale took most of the year to be completed after one of Family Group's creditors, television programming supplier MCA Television, objected to the repayment plan only to be overruled by a bankruptcy judge.

After the deal was consummated in October 1991, the FCC approved a key modification of the WEUX construction permit, allowing construction to finally proceed at a site near Lafayette. The station finally began broadcasting on February 9, 1993. A new tower was built for WEUX at Colfax in 1995, housing a new transmitter facility broadcasting at the increased effective radiated power of 1.5 million watts. Grant Broadcasting acquired WLAX/WEUX from Aries in 1996.

Modern history
From March 2011 to January 2012, WLAX in La Crosse and WQOW in Eau Claire provided temporary transmission of WEAU after its tower at Fairchild collapsed in an ice storm.

On November 6, 2013, Nexstar Broadcasting Group announced that it would purchase the Grant stations, including WLAX/WEUX, for $87.5 million. The sale was completed on December 1, 2014.

Newscasts
In 1995, WLAX/WEUX began carrying two-minute newsbreaks before 6 and 10 p.m. and a monthly community affairs program, Impact.

Beginning August 28, 2006, WLAX/WEUX began airing a 30-minute nightly 9 p.m. newscast, produced by WEAU at its studios.

Technical information
WLAX and WEUX broadcast two shared channels (Fox and Antenna TV) as well as two unique diginets each from Scripps Networks. In 2016, when Nexstar reached a group deal for carriage of the then-Katz Broadcasting diginets, separate offerings were launched from each transmitter.

Both stations discontinued analog broadcasts on February 17, 2009. While the national digital TV transition was delayed to June, all of the major commercial stations in La Crosse and Eau Claire converted on the original airdate.

References

External links

WEAU

Television channels and stations established in 1986
1986 establishments in Wisconsin
LAX
Fox network affiliates
MeTV affiliates
Laff (TV network) affiliates
Grit (TV network) affiliates
Nexstar Media Group